Roland Bardet is a Swiss retired slalom canoeist who competed from the mid-1950s to the mid-1960s. He won three medals in the C-1 team event at the ICF Canoe Slalom World Championships with a silver (1953) and two bronzes (1955, 1959).

References

Swiss male canoeists
Possibly living people
Year of birth missing (living people)
Medalists at the ICF Canoe Slalom World Championships